The 2021–22 season was the 52nd season in the existence of Paris Saint-Germain F.C. and the club's 48th consecutive season in the top flight of French football. In addition to the domestic league, Paris Saint-Germain participated in this season's editions of the Coupe de France and the UEFA Champions League, having lost the Trophée des Champions for the first time in nine years.

Before the season proper, PSG were widely characterized as a dream team, as they acquired the 2021 Ballon d'Or winner Lionel Messi, the 2021 Yashin Trophy winner Gianluigi Donnarumma, Ballon d'Or Dream Teamer Sergio Ramos, and the Netherlands vice-captain Georginio Wijnaldum—while spending close to €100 million on other transfer fees and turning down an offer north of €200 million for Kylian Mbappé—in the summer transfer window. However, the season was widely considered a disappointment: whilst PSG won the Ligue 1 title back, they were eliminated from the Coupe de France by Nice in the round of 16, and suffered a disappointing exit in the Champions League to Real Madrid, surrendering a 1–0 first-leg lead to lose 3–2 on aggregate.

Kits

Players
As of 18 May 2022.

First-team squad

Out on loan

Other players under contract

Transfers

In

Out

Pre-season and friendlies

Competitions

Overall record

Ligue 1

League table

Results summary

Results by round

Matches
The league fixtures were announced on 25 June 2021.

Coupe de France

Trophée des Champions

UEFA Champions League

Group stage

The draw for the group stage was held on 26 August 2021.

Knockout phase

Round of 16
The draw for the round of 16 was held on 13 December 2021.

Statistics

Appearances and goals

|-
! colspan="16" style="background:#dcdcdc; text-align:center"| Goalkeepers

|-
! colspan="16" style="background:#dcdcdc; text-align:center"| Defenders

|-
! colspan="16" style="background:#dcdcdc; text-align:center"| Midfielders

|-

|-
! colspan="16" style="background:#dcdcdc; text-align:center"| Forwards

|-
! colspan="16" style="background:#dcdcdc; text-align:center"| Players transferred out during the season

|-

Goalscorers

References

Paris Saint-Germain F.C. seasons
Paris Saint-Germain
Paris Saint-Germain
French football championship-winning seasons